A Home Too Far is a 1990 Taiwanese war drama film directed by Kevin Chu, starring Andy Lau, Tou Chung-hua and Ko Chun-hsiung. The film is based on Bo Yang's novel, The Alien Realm, which is the story of the Republic of China Army's 93rd Division taking refuge in Santikhiri (Mae Salong) on the border between Myanmar and Thailand.

Plot 
In the early 1950s, the Chinese Civil War has ended with the defeat of Republic of China and the establishment of the People's Republic of China by the communists. Soldiers from the 93rd Division of the Republic of China Army take their families with them and leave southwestern China by entering northern Burma (Myanmar). The hike through the jungle is full of disasters and shortages of supplies, but the survivors reach and settle within the China–Burma border. They build a village and form an alliance with a local armed gang to resist attacks from the Burmese government. Later, the relocated government of the Republic of China offers to take the soldiers and their families to Taiwan, but some are disappointed with the government and decide to stay.

Cast 
 Andy Lau as Little Tu/Hua Chung-hsing
 Tou Chung-hua as Deng Ke-pao
 Ko Chun-hsiung as General Li Kuo-hui
 Ku Feng as General Li Mi
 Siqin Gaowa as Li Kuo-hui's wife

See also 
 Andy Lau filmography
 Chiang Kai-shek
 Kuomintang in Burma

References

External links 
 

1990 films
1990s war drama films
Films directed by Kevin Chu
Taiwanese war drama films
1990s Mandarin-language films
Films set in Myanmar
Films set in the 1950s
Films based on Taiwanese novels
1990 drama films